Xujiayao, located in the Nihewan Basin in China, is an early Late Pleistocene paleoanthropological site famous for its archaic hominin fossils.

Location
Xujiayao is located on the west bank of the Liyi River, a tributary of the Sanggan River. Xujiayao actually consists of two sites, Locality 73113 and Locality 74093. Locality 73113 is located near Xujiayao village in Yanggao County, Shanxi, while Locality 74093 is located near Houjiayao village in Yangyuan County, Hebei. Most of the fossils and artefacts were found at Locality 74093.

Discovery and excavations
Xujiayao was discovered by researchers from the Institute of Vertebrate Paleontology and Paleoanthropology (IVPP) in 1974. IVPP carried out excavations in 1976, 1977, and 1979. Later excavations, in 2007 and 2008, were carried out by the Hebei Provincial Institute of Cultural Relics.

The Xujiayao hominin

Twenty hominid fossils were discovered at Xujiayao, consisting of 12 parietal bones, 1 temporal bone, 2 occipital bones, 1 mandibular bone  fragment, 1 juvenile maxilla, and 3 isolated teeth.

The fossils remains at Xujiayao are difficult to classify and are of an uncertain taxonomic lineage, possibly representing a distinct hominin lineage.

The Xujiayao fossils are characterized by a mix of Homo erectus and Homo sapiens features. The skulls  also have a thick cranial vault, at the upper range of Homo erectus pekinensis. The maxilla exhibits features more typical of modern Homo sapiens.

Dental analysis shows that the Xujiayao hominin appears to retain many archaic features found in hominin fossils, such as Homo pekinensis, from the Early and Middle Pleistocene in East Asia, share more similarities with these earlier East Asian hominins, and share some similarities with Neanderthals. While fossil sample Xujiayao 15 had mostly non-Neanderthal features appearance-wise, a CT scan revealed that the inner ear, surprisingly, was arranged in a way that was typical of Neanderthal inner ears.

One of the fossil samples, Xujiayao 11, had an enlarged parietal foramen (a hole in the skull), an extremely rare abnormality that is found in less than 1 out of 25,000 cases in modern humans. Xujiayao 11 is the oldest hominin fossil to exhibit this abnormality.

In terms of brain capacity, "Researchers reconstructed a complete skull of Xujiayao Man for the first time and estimated that the cranial capacity of the ancient relative of modern humans reached 1,700 cubic centimeters" and "The average brain capacity of modern humans is about 1,400 cc and the normal range is from 1,100 cc to 1,700 cc, "

Fauna
Around 5000 specimens from twenty-one distinct species are represented at Xujiayao. The large majority of the remains belong to Przewalski's horse and Equus hemionus. The next most common remains belong to Coelodonta, Spirocerus (Xujiayao antelope/Spirocerus hsuchiayaocus and Pei's antelope/Spirocerus peii), Procapra and Gazella. Some red deer, sika deer and pig remains were also found.

The Xujiayao hominin excelled as horse hunters, having regular access to animal protein, primarily coming from equids.

Artefacts
Almost 30,000 lithic, bone and antler artefacts were also unearthed at Xujiayao. Tools found at Xujiayao include scrapers, points, gravers, anvils, chopper and spheroids. Over 50% of the artefacts consist of finished tools.  Over 40% of the artefacts consist of scrapers. The artefacts there include the presence of over 1000 stone spheroids, the most of any Paleolithic site in China.

References

Bibliography

Paleoanthropological sites
Paleolithic sites in China
Major National Historical and Cultural Sites in Shanxi